Vasiliy Ryabchenko (born 23 July 1954, Odesa, USSR) is a Ukrainian painter, photographer, and installation artist. One of the key artists in contemporary Ukrainian art, and the "New Ukrainian Wave".

Biography 

Vasiliy Ryabchenko was born on July 23, 1954 in Odesa in the family of a Soviet graphic artist Sergey Ryabchenko.

His art education started in 1966 at the Odesa Art School located on the territory of the Odesa Art College. In 1969, he entered the painting department of the Odesa Art College which was named after M. B. Grekov.

1974 - 1976 he was auditing courses at the Leningrad Higher School of Art and Design named after Mukhina in Leningrad. After returning to Odesa, he acquainted and made friends with Valentin Khrushch and others who would be known as the Odesa "nonconformists".

From 1978 to 1983 Vasiliy Ryabchenko studied at the South Ukrainian State Pedagogical University named after K. D. Ushinsky at the art and graphics faculty, where his teachers were Valery Geghamyan and Zinaida Borisyuk.

Since 1987 – a member of the Union of Artists of the USSR, later the National Union of Artists of Ukraine. During this period, a group of artists from Odesa appeared: Sergey Lykov, Elena Nekrasova, Oleksandr Rojtburd, Vasiliy Ryabchenko. Known as the “Odesa Group”. In the late 1980s, this group, which was not very popular among "official" environment of the Union of Artists and wasn’t connected with the unofficial environment – these new "nonconformist", held two major high-profile exhibitions "After Modernism 1" and "After Modernism 2" in the space of a state institution, the Odesa Art Museum. The themes, plots of works, and large-scale formats marked the beginning of a new direction in the fine arts of Odesa. This period included paintings from Vasiliy such as: "Coast of Unidentified Characters" (1989), "Red Room" (1988), "Victim" (1989), "Death of Actaeon" (1989), Diptych "Catchers" (1989), "Method of Temptation" (1990) and others.

In between the two above-mentioned exhibitions, an exhibition, "New Figurations", was held at the Odesa Literary Museum, in which, young artists from Kyiv were involved. This was the beginning of the integration of the "Odesa Group" into the context of the all-Ukrainian art movement that was a current trend at that time. Vasiliy Ryabchenko's works which were displayed at that exhibition were: "Rejection of Grace" (1988) and "Love - not Love" (1988).

Vasiliy Ryabchenko, was among the first who started working in the genre of installation, and his very first work in this direction was "Swings for Stumps", for a project "Steppes of Europe" at the Ujazdowski Castle (1993), curated by Jerzy Onukh. Later on, he created a great number of installations: "The Great Bambi" (1994), "Dedication to Madame Recamier" (1994), "Princess" (1996), "Academy of Cold" (1998), and others.

Since the early 1970s, the artist was constantly experimenting with photography. At first, the main subjects were non-staged, still lifes from everyday objects. He followed that by photo fixation of improvisations involving different objects and the human body. In which he used “emptiness” and asymmetry, which was characteristic of the Eastern tradition. He used this style for a series of photographs, which were put together in the project "Naked Dream" (1995). For this project Vasiliy Ryabchenko received an award along with the title of "Best Artist of Ukraine" according to the results of the first all-Ukrainian art festival "Golden Section" in 1996. In the same year he founded a creative association "Art Laboratory".

Work 
Vladimir Levashov identifies several periods in the work of Vasiliy Ryabchenko. The early works of the artist, dating back to the late 1970s - early 80s, are notable for a synthesis of "Western" and "Eastern" approaches to painting: an almost "English" aristocratic asceticism of the language, organically drifting towards the Chinese "dance of a brush", in other words restraint is balanced by freedom and lightness.

In the second half of the 1980s, Vasiliy Ryabchenko got interested in the ideas of the transavantgarde. Yet while in general, the Ukrainian transavantgarde gravitated toward the aesthetics of the baroque, Ryabchenko's works of this time can be described as "new rococo". The transavantgarde period of the artist is characterized by programmatic emptiness, well-balanced aestheticism, frivolous playfulness and mechanistic combinatorics. "Cats" is an example of the works of the second half of the 1980s, which is a story about two rival cats. In the next version, created when relations between the two superpowers were aggravated, which led to the collapse of the USSR, the plot changed its semantic context due to a change in size, color, painting style and the title – "Deterrence".

The "rococo line" can still be seen in Ryabchenko's subsequent works, right up to those created recently. However, they’ve become more emotional and slightly confusing, and a trace of irrationalism and anxiety appear in his paintings. Pastoral carelessness gradually gave way to reflection and growing drama.

Ukrainian art historian and art critic, Mikhail Rashkovetsky, said about Vasiliy Ryabchenko: “In his works Vasiliy Ryabchenko is a mediator of objective emptiness along the laws of beauty. Moreover, figurativeness does not diminish, but enhances this intention. To embody the vacuum, the artist multiplies the elegance of rocaille, the stylization of modernity and the luxury of the high-society baroque by the absolute deconstruction of mythological meanings.”

Exhibitions 

 2022 | Unfolding Landscapes / Art & History Museum, Brussels, Belgium
 2022 | Unfolding Landscapes / Art Centre Silkeborg Bad, Silkeborg, Denmark
 2020 | Strange Time / Art Laboratory (online)
 2017 | Outcasts Salon / Naval Museum, Odesa, Ukraine
 2017 | Cold Faith / Invogue Gallery, Odesa, Ukraine
 2016 | The Spirit of Tme / Zenko Art Foundation, Tatarov, Ukraine
 2016 | Recipe for Utopia / Modern Art Research Institute, Kyiv, Ukraine
 2016 | Dashing 90th / The Museum of Odesa Modern Art, Odesa, Ukraine
 2016 | Ergo sum. Self-portraits exhibition / Dukat Gallery, Kyiv, Ukraine
 2016 | Three Generations of Ukrainian artists in the Tatyana and Boris Grinev Collection / Yermilov Centre, Kharkov, Ukraine
 2015 | Enfant Terrible. Odesa conceptualism / National Art Museum of Ukraine, Kyiv, Ukraine
 2015 | Museum Collection. Ukrainian Contemporary Art 1985–2015 / Mystetskyi Arsenal, Kyiv, Ukraine
 2014 | Ukrainian Landscape / Mystetskyi Arsenal, Kyiv, Ukraine
 2013 | Odesa School. Tradition and Currency / Mystetskyi Arsenal, Kyiv, Ukraine
 2012 | The Myth. Ukrainian Baroque / National Art Museum of Ukraine, Kyiv, Ukraine
 2012 | Contemporary Ukrainian artists / Yermilov Centre, Kharkov, Ukraine
 2011 | Independent / Mystetskyi Arsenal, Kyiv, Ukraine
 2010 | TOP-10 Contemporary Artists of Odesa / Hudpromo Gallery, Odesa, Ukraine
 2010 | Star Wars / Korobchinsky Art Centre, Odesa, Ukraine
 2009 | Restart / Marine Art Terminal, Odesa, Ukraine
 2009 | Ukrainian New Wave / National Art Museum of Ukraine, Kyiv, Ukraine
 2008 | Odesa Contemporary Art / The Museum of Odesa Modern Art, Odesa, Ukraine
 2008 | Exhibition dedicated to the 70th anniversary of National Artists Union of Ukraine / Central Artists House, Kyiv, Ukraine
 2004 | Farewell to Arms / Mystetskyi Arsenal, Kyiv, Ukraine
 2003 | First Collection / Central Artists House, Kyiv, Ukraine
 2000 | Partial Eclipse / French Cultural Center, Belgrade, Yugoslavia
 2000 | Positive Reaction / Odesa Museum of Western and Eastern Art, Odesa, Ukraine
 1999 | Pinakothek / Ukrainian House, Kyiv, Ukraine
 1998 | Month of Photography / Bratislava, Slovakia
 1998 | Out-of-Graphics / Odesa Art Museum, Odesa, Ukraine
 1998 | Coldness Academy / Odesa Art Museum, Odesa, Ukraine
 1998 | Sides / Karas Gallery, Kyiv, Ukraine
 1998 | Two Days and Two Nights / Contemporary Music Festival, Odesa, Ukraine
 1998 | All-Ukrainian Youth Exhibition / Central Artists House, Kyiv, Ukraine
 1997 | Photosynthesis / Exhibitions directorate of the National Artists Union of Ukraine, Kyiv, Ukraine
 1996 | Phantom Opera / Young Spectator Theater, Odesa, Ukraine
 1996 | Jam Look / Contemporary Art Center, Kyiv-Mohyla Academy, Kyiv, Ukraine
 1996 | Golden section / Applicants Exhibition for the title "Best Artist of 1996", Ukrainian House, Kyiv, Ukraine
 1996 | Commodity Fetishism / Ukrainian House, Kyiv, Ukraine
 1996 | Naked Dream / Blanc Art Gallery, Kyiv, Ukraine
 1996 | Family Album / Contemporary Art Center, Kyiv-Mohyla Academy, Kyiv, Ukraine
 1996 | Synthetic Art Advertising / Karas Gallery, Kyiv, Ukraine
 1996 | Batiscaf - 1 / International Symposium / Sailors Palace, Odesa, Ukraine
 1996 | ART Festival Participant / Odesa Museum of Western and Eastern Art, Odesa, Ukraine
 1996 | Two Days and Two Nights / Contemporary Music Festival, Odesa, Ukraine
 1995 | Dr. Frankenstein's Study / Scientists House, Odesa, Ukraine
 1995 | Blood Test / Exhibitions directorate of the National Artists Union of Ukraine, Kyiv, Ukraine
 1995 | Kandinsky Syndrome / Local History Museum, Odesa, Ukraine
 1995 | Two Days and Two Nights / Tirs Contemporary Art Center, Odesa, Ukraine
 1994 | Free Zone / Odesa Art Museum, Odesa, Ukraine
 1994 | Cultural Revolution Space / Ukrainian House, Kyiv, Ukraine
 1994 | Terrible - amorous / Tirs Contemporary Art Center, Odesa, Ukraine
 1994 | Traditions Continuation / Odesa Art Museum, Odesa, Ukraine
 1994 | Lux ex tenebris / Tirs Contemporary Art Center, Odesa, Ukraine
 1993 | Grafik aus Odesa / Municipal Gallery, Rosenheim, Germany
 1993 | Random Exhibition / Tirs Contemporary Art Center, Odesa, Ukraine
 1993 | Steppes of Europe / Ujazdowski Castle, Warsaw, Poland
 1993 | Diaspora / Central Artists House, Moscow, Russia
 1991 | Kunst aus Odesa / Galerie im Alten Rathaus, Prien am Chiemsee, Germany
 1991 | The Glory and Modernity of Odesa / Yokohama, Japan
 1991 | Ukrainian Pictorial Art of the ХХ century / National Art Museum of Ukraine, Kyiv, USSR
 1990 | Babylon / Central Youth Palace, Moscow, USSR
 1990 | After Modernism - 2 / Odesa Art Museum, Odesa, USSR
 1990 | Avec Cézanne, avec Van Gogh pour la montagne Sant Victore... / Marseille, France
 1990 | Soviart. Three generations of Ukrainian pictorial art of the 60-80s / Odense, Denmark
 1990 | Soviart. Three generations of Ukrainian pictorial art of the 60-80s / Commerce and Industry Chamber, Kyiv, USSR
 1989 | After Modernism / Odesa Art Museum, Odesa, USSR
 1989 | New Figurations / Literary Museum, Odesa, USSR
 1988 | All-Union Young Artists Exhibition / Manezh, Moscow, USSR
 1973 – 1989 | participant of regional, republican, all-Union, foreign exhibitions

Collections 

 Zimmerli Art Museum at Rutgers University (New Jersey, United States)
 Udmurt Republican Fine Arts Museum (Izhevsk, Russia)
 Museum of Modern Art of Ukraine (Kyiv, Ukraine)
 Odesa Fine Arts Museum (Odesa, Ukraine)
 The Museum of Odesa Modern Art (Odesa, Ukraine)
 Nikanor Onatsky Regional Art Museum (Sumy, Ukraine)
 Chernihiv Regional Art Museum (Chernihiv, Ukraine)
 Ministry of Culture of Ukraine (Kyiv, Ukraine)
 Exhibitions directorate of the National Artists Union of Ukraine (Kyiv, Ukraine)
 Zaporozhye Regional Art Museum (Zaporozhye, Ukraine)
 Cherkasy Regional Art Museum (Cherkasy, Ukraine)
 Museum of Contemporary Ukrainian Art Korsakiv (Lutsk, Ukraine)

Bibliography 
Steffy Antony, "Interpretation of Emotions Through Colors and Patterns used in "Red Room I" by Vasiliy Ryabchenko" / International Journal of Innovative Technology and Exploring Engineering (IJITEE) / ISSN: 2278-3075,Volume-8, Issue-7C2, May 2019
Museum collection "Ukrainian Contemporary Art 1985–2015 from private collections" / Art Arsenal – Kyiv, 2015. – p. 52 – 53
Contemporary ukrainian artist. – Rodovid, 2012. – p. 136 – 143
Myth. Ukrainian Baroque / National Art Museum of Ukraine. – Kyiv, 2012. – p. 39, 161
All-Ukrainian Triennial of Painting, Kyiv – 2010 / National Union of Artists of Ukraine. – 2010. – p. 37
Ukrainian New Wave / National Art Museum of Ukraine. — Kyiv, 2009. — p. 164 – 171
Visual art. From avant-garde shifts to the newest directions. The development of visual art of Ukraine of the XX-XXI century. — Modern Art Research Institute — Kyiv, 2008. — p. 119
Modern art of the times of independence of Ukraine: 100 names. – Mysl. – 2008. – p. 536–539, p. 640
Odesa Regional Organization of the National Union of Artists of Ukraine. – Grafikplus, 2006. – p. 117
Farewell to arms / Art Arsenal. — Kyiv, 2004. — p. 67, 121
Portfolio. The art of Odesa in the 1990s. Collection of texts / Soros Center for Contemporary Art-Odesa. – Odesa, 1999. – p. 13, 15, 22, 24–26, 36, 52–53, 60–65, 164–167, 294–301, 312
Ukrainian art of the 1960s – 1980s. – Soviart. – Mammens Bogtrykkeri A / S. – p. 9 – 20. p. 88 – 89

References

External links 
 Official website

1954 births
Living people
Artists from Odesa
Ukrainian contemporary artists
Ukrainian male painters
Ukrainian photographers
Installation artists
Postmodern artists
20th-century Ukrainian painters
20th-century Ukrainian male artists
21st-century Ukrainian painters
21st-century Ukrainian male artists
K. D. Ushinsky South Ukrainian National Pedagogical University alumni
Neo-expressionist artists